The Curse of Iku is a 1918 American drama film directed by Frank Borzage and featuring Borzage, Tsuru Aoki, and Thomas Kurihara in lead dual roles. It is not known whether the film currently survives.

Plot
As described in a film magazine, Carroll (Borzage), an American sailor, is shipwrecked on the coast of Japan, and is befriended by a Japanese prince. As Americans are banned from the country, he is sentenced to being tortured but Iku, his prosecutor, is killed. Iku dies cursing Carroll, who escapes with Iku's sister, Omi San (Aoki). Fifty years later Iku the third is sent to America to learn its customs. He falls in love with Virginia Stafford and, learning that she is the fiancé of Allan Carroll III (Borzage) and remembering his ancestor's band of hate, he kidnaps Virginia, takes her to Japan and marries her according to Japanese custom. Carroll comes to Japan and locates Virginia. A terrible struggle ensues in which Iku meets his death and Virginia is rescued. With the death of Iku, the curse is lifted.

Cast
Frank Borzage as Allan Carroll / Allan Carroll III
Tsuru Aoki as Omi San
Thomas Kurihara (credited as Thomas Kurihara)

Production
In 1919 the film was reedited down to six reels with new intertitles, which changed the location of the action to the Malaysian coast, and released under state's rights basis with the title Ashes of Desire.

Reception
Like many American films of the time, The Curse of Iku was subject to cuts by city and state film censorship boards. For example, the Chicago Board of Censors required cuts, in Reel 1, of the Japanese man murdering foreigner and wiping bloody sword, Reel 3, four closeup torture scenes showing young woman and flash four others, four scenes of crucifixion, Reel 4, all scenes of white woman in Japanese man's room, all scenes of Japanese man looking through keyhole into young woman's room and reflection in his eye, Reel 5, two scenes of Japanese man pouring chloroform on handkerchief, three scenes of slugging woman's father, attack on young woman in automobile and chloroforming her, scene of man being dragged from river, Reel 6, Japanese woman with hypodermic needle in hand, the intertitle "Iku gives you choice; will you be his dutiful wife or the plaything of the rabble?", two scenes of young American woman fighting with Japanese man, closeup of "woman tamer" leering through barred doors, Reel 7, stabbing of Japanese woman, two closeups of fight where daggers are used, and closeup of Japanese man with blood flowing from mouth.

References

External links 
 

1918 drama films
1918 films
Silent American drama films
American silent feature films
Films directed by Frank Borzage
American black-and-white films
1910s American films